Neossarromyia is a genus of parasitic flies in the family Tachinidae.

References

Further reading

 
 
 
 

Tachinidae
Articles created by Qbugbot